USS Keosauqua  was a proposed United States Navy screw  sloop-of-war or steam frigate that was cancelled in 1866 without being completed.

Keosauqua was a wooden-hulled bark-rigged (or ship-rigged) Contoocook-class screw sloop-of-war or steam frigate with a single funnel slated to be built for the Union Navy late in the American Civil War. She was listed in the 1864 Naval Register as "building;" her hull was projected but never completed.

Because of the collapse of the Confederate States of America in 1865, plans for her construction were cancelled in 1866. Her name was stricken from the Navy List in 1866.

References 
Notes

Bibliography
 
 

 

Sloops of the United States Navy
Cancelled ships of the United States Navy